Smythe is an unincorporated community in Knight Township, Vanderburgh County, in the U.S. state of Indiana.

It is located within the city limits of Evansville.

History
Smythe was named after a local family of settlers. An old variant name of the community was called Burkhart Station.

Geography

References

Unincorporated communities in Vanderburgh County, Indiana
Unincorporated communities in Indiana